Mary E. C. Bancker (pen name, Betsey Bancker; September 1, 1860 – December 1921) was an American author. she produced the opera Dovetta in April 1889, in the Standard Theater in New York.

Early life and education
Mary Elizabeth Cradinger Bancker was born in New York City, September 1, 1860. She was the daughter of Josiah Hook Bancker and Mary Elizabeth (née Henry). Siblings included Maria Ann Bancker, Josiah H. Bancker, and Heymer Henry Bancker.

Bancker was a lineal descendant of the Knickerbocker family whose name she carried, which came from Holland in 1658. The Bancker family intermarried with the DePuysters, Rutgers, Ogdens, and Livingstons. The maternal grandparents of Bancker were Michael Henry and Maria Anne Hymes, his wife. Michael was one of the leading merchants of New York, as well as patron of art, and founder and owner of the once famous picture gallery at Number 100 Broadway. Sir Henry was of Huguenot extraction. His ancestors, driven out of France after the revocation of the Edict of Nantes, during the reign of Louis XIV, established themselves at Henry's Grove, County Armagh, Ireland. Mr. Henry's father, John Sinclair Henry, came to America with the idea of founding a colony in South Carolina. Homeward bound, he stopped in New York, where he met Leah, of the old Brevoort family, of that city, and, wooing and wedding her, he remained and established a shipping business between the United States and Newry, Ireland. He was one of the founders of the New York Stock Exchange.

Bancker began her education in New York, and at a very impressionable age, traveled extensively in Europe and in the tropics of America. She had a knowledge of the French and Spanish languages.

Career
Bancker's early writing efforts were a series of sketches descriptive of outdoor life, appearing in the Turf, Field and Farm. These articles were well received and extensively copied. She corresponded for the Cincinnati Enquirer during several years, and then represented the Montreal Herald in New York as staff correspondent for that Canadian journal. She was known from Quebec to British Columbia. She constantly wrote upon a variety of topics that found their way to U.S. as well as Canadian periodicals.

Dovetta
Bancker produced the opera Dovetta in April 1889, in the Standard Theater in New York, in conjunction with Emma Marcy Raymond. Bancker and Charles Raynaud were the librettists.

Morrissey alleged that in the fall of 1888, the defendants agreed to give him  for putting the opera on the stage at the Standard Theatre for the season of 1888–9. When the time came to pay the money, Morrissey said that it was not forthcoming, and so he brought on the suit. The defendants denied that the contract was ever completed. Bancker alleged that she gave Morrissey , expecting that the contract would be signed, and when it was not, she demanded the return of the money. Morrissey refused to give it back and she brought a suit. The case came up before Justice Edward Patterson in the Supreme Court  Chambers. Decision was reserved upon a motion for dismissal of the complaint.

Notes

References

Attribution

Bibliography

External links
  
 

1860 births
1921 deaths
19th-century American writers
19th-century American women writers
19th-century pseudonymous writers
Writers from New York City
Pseudonymous women writers
Wikipedia articles incorporating text from A Woman of the Century